Pramila Mallik is an Indian politician. She was elected to the Odisha Legislative Assembly from Binjharpur as a member of the Biju Janata Dal.

References

Living people
Biju Janata Dal politicians
Janata Dal politicians
Women in Odisha politics
Odisha MLAs 2019–2024
Odisha MLAs 2014–2019
Odisha MLAs 2009–2014
Odisha MLAs 2004–2009
Odisha MLAs 2000–2004
Odisha MLAs 1990–1995
Year of birth missing (living people)
21st-century Indian women politicians